The Order of Jamaica is the fifth of the six orders in the Jamaican honours system. The Order was established in 1969, and it is considered the equivalent of a knighthood in the British honours system.

Membership in the Order can be conferred upon any Jamaican citizen of outstanding distinction. Honorary membership in the Order can be conferred upon any distinguished citizen of a country other than Jamaica.

Members and Honorary Members are entitled to:
 wear the insignia of the Order as a decoration,
 be styled "The Honourable",
 use the post-nominal letters "OJ" (for Members) or "OJ (Hon.)" (for Honorary Members).

The motto of the Order is "For a covenant of the people".

See also
List of recipients of the Order of Jamaica

References

Order of Jamaica. Office of the Prime Minister.

External links
 Jamaica National Awards

 
Jamaica, Order of
Awards established in 1969